The 1975 Campeonato Brasileiro Série A (officially the I Copa Brasil) was the 19th edition of the Campeonato Brasileiro Série A.

Overview
It was performed by 42 teams, and Internacional won the championship. It was divided into four phases:
In the First phase, the 42 teams were divided into two groups of eleven teams and two groups of ten. The teams played once against the teams of the other group that had an equal number of team to theirs, meaning that the teams of Group A would face the teams of Group B and the teams of Group C would face the ones of Group D. No teams were eliminated, and victories by two goals of difference or more were worth three points.
In the Second phase, the teams were divided into six groups.  Two group comprised ten teams, with Group 1 receiving the top five teams in Group A and B, and Group 2 receiving the top five teams in groups C and D. The teams of those group played once against those of the other, and the six best teams in each group qualified to the third phase. The Groups 3, 4, 5 and 6 received the teams that couldn't qualify to the Groups 1 and 2, and in each one of them, the teams played against the teams of their own groups once, and only one team in each group qualified to the Third phase. As in the previous round, victories by two goals of difference or more were worth three points.
In the third phase, The 16 teams were divided into two group of eight teams, and each team played against the others of its own group. The first two teams in each group qualified to the Semifinals, as in the previous rounds, victories by two goals of difference or more were worth three points.
Both semifinals and finals were disputed in the form of a one-leg knock out tournament.

First phase

Group A

Group B

Group C

Group D

Second phase

Group 1

Group 2

Group 3

Group 4

Group 5

Group 6

Third phase

Group 1

Group 2

Semifinals

Finals

Final standings

References
 1975 Campeonato Brasileiro Série A at RSSSF

1975
1
Bra
B